Yanti Armentia Barsales is a Filipino former footballer who is best known for playing for the Philippine Air Force and the Philippines national football team.

Early life and education
Yanti Barsales was born on February 6, 1973 and grew up in Magpet, North Cotabato. He would discover football when his family moved to Iloilo. He took up the sport when he was attending Iloilo State College of Fisheries (ISCF) in Tiwi, Barotac Nuevo, for his high school studies. He also simultaneously worked in the fishponds, improving his own physique at a young age.

Career
Barsales would went on to play for the Barotac Nuevo team in the 1989 Coke Go-For-Goal national championship in the U16 division. His hometown team would reach the finals. Having a built more developed than his peers at the time, the rival team filed a formal protest against Barsales alleging he was overaged. The complaint was entertained but later dismissed. He would later help the Iloilo win the U19 Adidas Cup title and garnered the most valuable player award.

Barsales, would become an enlisted personnel of the Philippine Air Force (PAF) was part of the its club. He played for Air Force from 1994 until his retirement from military service in 2022.

PAF would play in the de facto top-flight, United Football League (UFL). He helped the team clinch the 2011 UFL Cup title. He would also suit up for the team in their brief stint in the Philippines Football League (PFL) for the 2019 season.

International
Barsales played for the Philippines national football team from 1992 to 2011. At the 2002 FIFA World Cup qualifiers, Yanti Barsales made the first goal for the Philippines at a FIFA World Cup qualifier against Syria held in May 2001. He would be part of the Philippines roster for the 1998, 2000 and 2010 AFF Championships.

He retired from the national team in 2011 following the conclusion of the UFL Cup.

Personal life
Barsales is married to Gemma Araneta with whom he has four children. Bersales in an Illongo which hails from Barotac Nuevo. In 2023, he was residing with his family in Angeles City. Other relatives involved in football are Ian Araneta and Jovin Bedic, his stepbrother and nephew respectively.

References

1973 births
Filipino footballers
Footballers from Iloilo
Philippines international footballers
People from Cotabato
Philippine Air Force F.C. players
Philippine Air Force personnel
Living people